Mateusz Andrzej Klich (born 13 June 1990) is a Polish professional footballer who plays as a midfielder for D.C. United and the Poland national team.

Club career

Cracovia
Born in Tarnów, Klich debuted in the Ekstraklasa in November 2008. During the 2009–10 season, he gradually became a regular in Cracovia's starting eleven.

Wolfsburg
On 14 June 2011, he signed with Bundesliga side VfL Wolfsburg on a three-year deal. Wolfsburg paid €1.5 million for Klich, making him the most valuable player in Cracovia's club history.

PEC Zwolle
Klich was sent on loan to Dutch club PEC Zwolle for half a season before making the transfer permanent for a fee reported as €200,000, with Wolfsburg securing a repurchase option. During his time at Zwolle he won the 2013–14 KNVB Cup on 20 April 2014 beating Ajax 5–1 in the final which also saw the side obtain Europa League qualification.

Return to Wolfsburg
In June 2014 Wolfsburg exercised their repurchase option for Klich. During the subsequent first half of the season however, he did not play in the Bundesliga, after struggling to displace regular starters Kevin De Bruyne, Josuha Guilavogui and Luiz Gustavo in the centre midfield positions and was used only in the reserve team.

1. FC Kaiserslautern
In early January 2015, Klich joined 2. Bundesliga club 1. FC Kaiserslautern, with him signing a contract until summer 2018. The transfer fee was undisclosed.

FC Twente
On 26 August 2016, he joined Eredivisie side FC Twente on a three-year contract. He was given squad number 43 and made his debut for Twente on 10 September 2016 against SC Heerenveen. He scored his first goal for the club on 2 October 2016, in a 1–1 draw against Heracles Almelo. In his first season at the club, he scored six goals and made four assists to help FC Twente to a seventh-place finish in the Eredivisie.

Leeds United
After an initial bid was rejected, on 23 June 2017, Klich signed a three-year deal with English club Leeds United for an undisclosed fee. On 9 August, he made his first-team debut in a 4–1 League Cup victory against Port Vale, and his League debut 10 days later in a 2–0 win against Sunderland. However, he found himself behind Kalvin Phillips, Eunan O'Kane and Ronaldo Vieira in the pecking order. His first and only League start for the season came on 26 September 2017, in the defeat against Cardiff City with Klich slipping and losing possession leading to a goal from Kenneth Zohore. Klich revealed that he felt his unfortunate slip led to him being dropped by the then manager Thomas Christiansen. After October he was used very sparsely.

On 22 January 2018, Klich joined Dutch club FC Utrecht on a six-month loan from Leeds United until the end of the 2017–18 season.

FC Utrecht loan
On 22 January 2018, Klich was sent on loan at FC Utrecht until the end of the season. On 4 February 2018, Klich made his debut in a 2–2 draw against Excelsior. He quickly re-found his form at Utrecht, he gained an assist against Roda JC on 18 February in a 4–1 victory.

On 29 April 2018, in Utrecht's 2–2 draw against Heracles Almelo, Klich according to Opta Stats created 11 chances and gained an assist and man of the match award in the match; the chance creation by Klich was the highest number of chances created in a single Eredivisie match since Christian Eriksen for Ajax in 2012 against Roda JC.

On 6 May 2018, on the final day of the season, Klich scored the winner for Utrecht (his first goal for the club) in a 1–0 victory against VVV-Venlo. Klich impressed for Utrecht during the loan spell and helped them finish 5th and into the Eredivisie Europa League playoffs. When asked if he would return to Leeds he said he 'was 99% sure as he had unfinished business'.

Return to Leeds

2018–19 season
After returning to Leeds for the start of pre-season under new Leeds head coach Marcelo Bielsa, Klich made his first appearance back at Leeds in the pre-season friendly 1–1 draw against York City on 20 July 2018, where he played in a new centre-back role before reverting to a deep-lying playmaker position in the second half. He scored his first league goal for Leeds in the opening game of the 2018–19 season on 5 August 2018 against Stoke City at Elland Road in a 3–1 win, his first competitive game for the club in almost seven months. The following week he scored his second goal for the club in a 4–1 win against Derby County on 11 August 2018 and, after scoring against Norwich City on 25 August, his third goal in five games, Klich was named in the Poland squad again for the first time in four years after impressing for Leeds at the beginning of the 2018–19 season.

On 28 April, Klich scored a 'controversial goal' (his ninth of the season). The goal came in a match against Aston Villa during a 1–1 draw, when Jonathan Kodjia remained on the ground with an injury. Teammate Tyler Roberts passed the ball to Klich who took it up the left wing and put the ball into the far corner past Jed Steer. The goal – the first of the game – sparked pandemonium, with Villa's Conor Hourihane, Ahmed Elmohamady, Neil Taylor and Leeds' Patrick Bamford caught up in a fracas with Klich at its centre, which involved several additional players from both sides and was eventually broken up by referee Stuart Attwell, Elland Road stewards and other players. In the immediate aftermath, Attwell sent off the peripherally involved Anwar El Ghazi with a straight red card (subsequently rescinded by The FA) and head coach Marcelo Bielsa's response to his players was, in the interests of fairness and after consulting with Villa boss Dean Smith, that his team should allow an unchallenged equaliser to be scored. From the restart, Albert Adomah essentially walked the ball into net unchallenged by 10 Leeds players, with only Pontus Jansson giving chase and nearly dispossessing the forward.

On 28 April, he won both the Leeds United Goal of the Season award at the club's annual ceremony for his goal against Sheffield Wednesday. On 5 May 2019, Klich scored his 10th goal of the season in a 3–2 defeat against Ipswich Town.

During the 2018–19 Leeds United F.C. season, Klich played 50 games in all competitions, scoring 10 goals and nine assists, being the club's only ever-present player for the League season, after Leeds finished the regular season in third place after dropping out of the automatic promotion places with three games left after a defeat to 10 man Wigan Athletic on 19 April. Leeds qualified for the playoffs, including Klich starting the playoff fixtures against sixth-placed Derby County, despite Leeds taking a 1–0 win at Pride Park into the home leg at Elland Road, Leeds lost 4–2 in an encounter that saw Dallas score a brace in the second leg, with Leeds down to 10 men after the red card of Gaetano Berardi, and saw Derby progress to the final against Aston Villa.

2019–20 season
Klich scored his first goal of the 2019–20 season on 13 August in the EFL Cup against Salford City to help earn a 3–0 victory. He scored his second goal of the season in Leeds 2–0 win against Barnsley on 15 September 2019.

On 9 November 2019, Klich signed a new four-and-a-half-year contract with Leeds. Until the penultimate game of the season on 19 July 2020, he had started every league game - 92 games - since Marcelo Bielsa became manager in 2018 and his previous three-year deal with Leeds was due to expire in the summer of 2020. On 30 November, Klich scored two goals in a 4–0 victory against Middlesbrough. This took Leeds to the top of the Championship, and sealed their five-game winning streak.

On 19 December, Klich won the EFL Championship Goal of the Month for November for his long range strike against Middlesbrough.

After the English professional football season was paused in March 2020 due to Impact of the COVID-19 pandemic on association football, the season was resumed during June, where Klich earned promotion with Leeds to the Premier League and also become the EFL Championship Champions for the 2019–20 season in July after the successful resumption of the season.

2020–21 season
Klich made his Premier League debut in the first match of the season against Liverpool on 12 September 2020, scoring his side's third goal in an enthralling 4–3 defeat to the reigning champions. He scored again and provided an assist in Leeds' second game of the season, a 4–3 win at home against fellow newly promoted side Fulham. He continued his impressive form with an assist in Leeds' 3–0 win away at Aston Villa, and scored a penalty in a 2–1 defeat to West Ham United.

2021–22 season 
Klich started in Leeds' first Premier League match of the season in a 5-1 away defeat against Manchester United. He had scored just one goal in this season, in their 2-2 draw with Everton, in the 41st minute, gaining two assists.

2022–23 season 

Klich had only played 16 matches this season, only getting goal contributions in the EFL Cup, both against Barnsley in a 3-1 win at home. Klich had played his final match on 4 January 2023, before his pending move to the United States. Leeds players formed a 'guard of honour' where they had all changed into shirts with Klich's face on the front, with his name and number on the back.

On January 13, 2023, Major League Soccer side D.C. United said it had signed Klich on a two-year contract.

International career
Klich made his debut for the national team of Poland on 5 June 2011 in a friendly match against Argentina. Poland won the match 2–1.
He scored his first goal in national team in the friendly game against Denmark on 14 August 2013.

On 27 August 2018, Klich was named in Poland team by manager Jerzy Brzęczek for matches with Italy and Republic of Ireland after a four-year absence from the Poland national side, with Klich impressing for Leeds after scoring 3 goals and 1 assist in the first 5 games of the 2018–19 season. On 7 September, Klich started for Poland in their UEFA Nations League 1–1 draw against Italy, with Klich having an involvement in the opening goal for Piotr Zieliński. On 11 September, he came off the bench in a friendly against Republic of Ireland to score an 87th-minute equalizer, his second national team goal to date.

On 17 May 2021, Klich was called up to Poland's UEFA Euro 2020 squad. He started all three Group E games as Poland failed to progress beyond the group stage. Klich also played in four of Poland's ten qualifying matches for the 2022 FIFA World Cup, but missed the play-off victory against Sweden due to suspension and ultimately missed out on Poland's squad for the tournament.

Personal life
His father is Wojciech Klich, who was also a professional footballer, playing 84 matches in the Polish first division, and currently works as a youth coach at Cracovia. His mother Małgorzata is a PE teacher who won a bronze medal at the Polish championships for 800m freestyle, whilst his sister Maja is a swimmer.

On 6 November 2018, Klich’s partner gave birth to his first child, Laura.

Leeds United's fans terrace song for Klich '40 Yards or 50 yards' is a reworked version of the song Rotterdam by The Beautiful South.

On 4 January 2023, Klich played his last game for Leeds United pending a move to MLS in the United States. At the end of the game the players changed into shirts with Klich's face and formed a 'guard of honour' to clap him off the pitch.  Klich was emotional and visibly moved, applauding the crowd and then disappearing down the tunnel.

Career statistics

Club

International

Scores and results list Poland's goal tally first, score column indicates score after each Klich goal.

Honours
PEC Zwolle
KNVB Cup: 2013–14

Leeds United 
EFL Championship: 2019–20

Individual
Leeds United Goal of the Season: 2018–19

References

External links

Profile on uefa.com

1990 births
Living people
Sportspeople from Tarnów
Polish footballers
Poland international footballers
Poland under-21 international footballers
Poland youth international footballers
Association football midfielders
MKS Cracovia (football) players
VfL Wolfsburg players
VfL Wolfsburg II players
PEC Zwolle players
Leeds United F.C. players
FC Utrecht players
1. FC Kaiserslautern players
1. FC Kaiserslautern II players
D.C. United players
Designated Players (MLS)
Ekstraklasa players
Eredivisie players
2. Bundesliga players
English Football League players
UEFA Euro 2020 players
Premier League players
Polish expatriate footballers
Polish expatriate sportspeople in Germany
Polish expatriate sportspeople in the Netherlands
Polish expatriate sportspeople in England
Polish expatriate sportspeople in the United States
Expatriate footballers in Germany
Expatriate footballers in the Netherlands
Expatriate footballers in England
Expatriate soccer players in the United States